Sareh Nouri (Persian: ساره نوری) is a Persian-American fashion designer known for her eponymous bridal line of wedding dresses and luxury robes.

Early life
Sareh Nouri was born in Tehran, Iran, and immigrated to the United States in 1989 at the age of nine. Her family lived in northern Virginia. Bridal designer Sareh Nouri received her B.A in graphic design from George Mason University. She is frequently cited as a notable alumna from the university. Before venturing into wedding dress design, Sareh Nouri worked on various commercial and non-profit media ads as a graphic designer.

Career 
After designing her own wedding dress in 2009, Nouri began working in the bridal industry in varying roles at high end bridal salons, eventually being promoted to buyer and director of sales. Nouri began making wedding dresses under her own name in 2011, launching a couture bridal label of wedding dresses manufactured in the USA. Now, bridal designs by Sareh Nouri have risen to popularity and are sold in upscale bridal boutiques and luxury department stores across the United States, most notably in New York City; Dallas, Texas; Atlanta, Georgia; North Carolina and Connecticut.

In addition to wedding dresses, bridal designer Sareh Nouri has launched a collection of luxury bridal robes.

Personal life 
Sareh Nouri was married in 2009 in Washington, D.C. at The Ritz-Carlton. She and her husband share twin daughters.

In the media 
Nouri's bridal design collections have been featured in Vogue.

Bridal collections and interviews by Nouri have been featured in various bridal magazines and websites including The Knot, Martha Stewart Weddings, Wedding Wire, Premier Brides, and Inside Weddings. Modern Luxury Weddings featured Nouri on the cover for their July 2020 issue.

Nouri's wedding dresses are sold at luxury department stores including Neiman Marcus and Bergdorf Goodman Nouri's designs are also available at Kleinfeld, the bridal boutique ostensibly known as the setting for the television series Say Yes to The Dress.

Nouri designed the wedding gown for former American Idol contestant Diana DeGarmo.

Nouri's first flagship store will be opening on June 1, 2021, at the luxury Mall at Short Hills in New Jersey.

References

External links
 

1979 births
Living people
American fashion designers
American women fashion designers
Wedding dress designers
People from Tehran
Iranian emigrants to the United States
George Mason University alumni
21st-century American women